KLIF-FM (93.3 MHz, "Hot 93.3") is a commercial radio station licensed to Haltom City, Texas, and serving the Dallas-Fort Worth Metroplex. The station is owned by Cumulus Media, and the broadcast license is held by Radio License Holding SRC LLC. It broadcasts a hot adult contemporary radio format, mainly focusing on hits from the 1990s and 2000s while also playing some songs from the 1980s, 2010s and today. The studios and offices are in the Victory Park district in Dallas just north of downtown.

The KLIF call sign has a long history of being associated with CHR/Top 40 music; the original KLIF (at 1190 AM) was Dallas/Fort Worth's most popular Top 40 music station in the 1960s and 1970s.

KLIF-FM's transmitter site is on Singleton Boulevard in West Dallas near the I-30/Loop 12 interchange.  It has an effective radiated power (ERP) of 50,000 watts, with its tower at 120 meters (394 ft) in height above average terrain (HAAT).  This gives KLIF-FM a limited signal, with most Dallas FM stations powered at 100,000 watts, and with towers four times taller than KLIF-FM.  It is licensed by iBiquity to broadcast a digital HD Radio signal. KLIF-FM stopped transmitting its digital signals in late November 2011 and resumed in early January 2012 before ceasing again in 2014. In May 2022, KLIF-FM resumed its digital broadcasts again.

History and formats

The Zone
Marcos A. Rodriguez was the first to control the license after having successfully obtained it directly from the Federal Communications Commission (FCC). After his financing source defaulted, Rodriguez sold the license to Susquehanna Radio.

93.3 FM began broadcasting on October 31, 1996, as KNBR-FM "The Zone", with an adult alternative format. The call letters KNBR-FM were only short-term, as they were changed to KKZN to match the moniker on December 20, 1996.

Merge Radio
After a day-long stunt with episodes of The Bob Newhart Show and a loop of "Pop Muzik" by M, the station became KKMR "Merge Radio", with a modern AC format on August 31, 1999. The first song on "Merge" was "Are You Gonna Go My Way?" by Lenny Kravitz. Station management referred to Merge as "the nation's first new digital media station." The name "Merge" was meant to signify the merging of traditional radio with the internet.

The Bone
At midnight on January 3, 2002, after playing "Brass in Pocket" by The Pretenders, the station began stunting with funeral bells and random audio soundbites. At 5 p.m. that day, the station became KDBN "The Bone", with a 1970s/1980s-based classic rock format (specifically hard rock and heavy metal from that era), launching with "Bad to the Bone" by George Thorogood and the Destroyers. The station's slogan was "Classic Texas Rock That Rocks!" This produced an initial spike in ratings, though the station lost much of that audience as the years progressed. The station featured longtime KZPS DJs Sam "Bo" Roberts and "Long" Jim White ("Bo and Jim") in the mornings. 
The KDBN call letters had been used on 1480 AM in Dallas for a business radio format from September 21, 1989, to September 4, 1991. Cumulus Media subsequently took control of the station in May 2006 as part of its acquisition of Susquehanna, instituted cost-cutting measures, and completely restored a classic rock format after the station had experimented with more recent rock offerings.

FM 93-3
On April 24, 2009, KDBN began stunting with music from the Dave Matthews Band with limited commercial interruptions. Three days later, the station switched back to adult album alternative as "FM 93-3 - Quality Rock", with the first song being "What's the Frequency, Kenneth?" by R.E.M.  On-air staff included The Regular Guys, a morning show syndicated from Atlanta, Alexis (middays), and Scott Gaines (afternoons). Among former on-air staff were Gary Thompson (mornings), Pugs and Kelly (afternoons), Candy Stuart, Bo Roberts, Yvonne Monet, Jeff K, Bob Carter, Channing, Jennifer Reed, Kat Von Erick, Debbie Sexxton, Squeaky, Paladin, Logan, Gary Zee, Royce Dex, Barb Smith (traffic reporter), and Rich Phillips (sports reporter). However, this format was short-lived, with poor ratings.

The station was, for a short time, an affiliate of the Dallas Cowboys Radio Network.

i93 

On September 2, 2009, the station began stunting again, urging listeners to tune in September 4 at Noon. At that time, the station launched a top 40 format as "i93", and on September 7, a call sign change to KLIF-FM was made.

As a reference to the station's i branding used for newer Cumulus-launched top 40 stations, the station's new top 40 format launched with The Black Eyed Peas' "I Gotta Feeling". The station aimed for an older audience; rival KHKS skewed toward younger listeners. KLIF was the flagship station for Nights Live with Adam Bomb. After another format change at 93.3 FM, the show moved back to Atlanta's WWWQ-FM.

Hot 93-3
In September 2014, websites were registered showing a possible rebranding or format change to rhythmic Top 40/CHR, urban, classic hits, oldies, smooth jazz, or rhythmic oldies. The registrations followed the recent hiring of former KBFF/Portland program director Louie Cruz for the same position at KLIF-FM. This station had not been able to make up ground on KHKS as it continued to hover right below a 2 share in the Dallas/Fort Worth Nielsen ratings of August 2014. The change was confirmed on October 3 of that year, when 93.3 began running liners promoting that "Something New Arrives At 93.3" at 5 p.m. that day, and relaunched as "Hot 93.3". While the station still maintained its Top 40 format as before, KLIF-FM began leaning towards rhythmic CHR.

On November 14, 2014, at 5 p.m., KLIF-FM began playing classic hip hop songs around the clock (as part of a holiday season-only promotion), only to be upstaged an hour later by KSOC, which dropped its urban AC direction to go full-time with classic hip hop as "Boom 94.5". It is not known if this was done intentionally, or if KLIF-FM was trying to pull a pre-empted strike to bring the format first to the area before another station picked it up. The flip has also resulted in Mediabase changing KLIF's reporting status from Top 40/CHR to rhythmic.

On December 2, 2014, at 6 p.m., KLIF-FM shifted its format to urban contemporary, retaining the "Hot 93.3" branding, even though Mediabase continued to list the station as a rhythmic reporter, with the first song being "Latch" by Disclosure featuring Sam Smith. Competitors in the format included KKDA-FM and KBFB. In March 2015, KLIF adjusted its direction back to Rhythmic with the inclusion of pop/dance crossovers that it had dropped previously and was added to the Nielsen BDS Rhythmic reporting panel.

In September 2015, KLIF-FM gradually returned to more of a mainstream Top 40/CHR format, putting it in competition with KHKS once again, a status affirmed with Mediabase returning KLIF-FM to its pop panel in November. Nielsen BDS continued to have KLIF-FM report to the rhythmic panel until May 2016. It currently competes with KHKS and, for a time from October 2016 to November 2017, CBS Radio-owned Hot AC-leaning KVIL. Ironically, AM sister station KLIF, during its Top 40 era, was competing with KVIL in the late 1960s. KLIF-FM also, to a lesser extent, competes with KHKS's sister station KDMX.

As of September 2019, KLIF shifted back to a Rhythmic Top 40 direction as it began increasing the amount of R&B/Hip-Hop currents being played, thus putting it back in competition with KKDA and KBFB again, while continuing to go after KHKS.

KLIF-FM is the third station in the Metroplex to use the "Hot" branding; the first was KRBV (now KJKK) from 1999 to 2001, and the second was KESS-FM (now KDXX) in 2013.

1990s/2000s hits
On December 19, 2022, at midnight, after playing "Goodbyes" by Post Malone featuring Young Thug, KLIF-FM shifted to a 1990s/2000s hits format, though still branded as "Hot 93.3", with the Ariana Grande remix version of "Save Your Tears" by The Weeknd being the first song played. The station focuses primarily on music from the 1990s through the 2010s, with a limited number of currents and recurrents remaining. The move takes KLIF-FM out of direct competition with KHKS and instead focuses their competition with similarly formatted KDMX, and came as the station had slipped under a 1-share in the Nielsen Audio ratings, carrying just a 0.8 in the October and November books, the last under the CHR format. The station moved on from morning host Mason and the syndicated Tino Cochino show. The Adam Bomb Show returns to the mornings, its first Morning show when the station started.  Midday host Ali and program director/afternoon host Sid Kelly remain with the station.

References

External links
Hot 93.3 official website

DFWRadioArchives discussion of KDBN
DFW Radio/TV History

LIF-FM
Radio stations established in 1996
Cumulus Media radio stations